Wronowo  is a village in the administrative district of Gmina Kościan, within Kościan County, Greater Poland Voivodeship, in west-central Poland.

The village has a population of 19.

References

Wronowo